The Asia/Oceania Zone was one of the three regional zones of the 2018 Davis Cup.

In the Asia/Oceania Zone there were four different tiers, called groups, in which teams competed against each other to advance to the upper tier. Winners in Group I advanced to the World Group Play-offs, along with losing teams from the World Group first round. Teams who lost their respective ties competed in the relegation play-offs, with winning teams remaining in Group I, whereas teams who lost their play-offs were relegated to the Asia/Oceania Zone Group II in 2019.

Participating nations
Seeds: 
All seeds received a bye into the second round.
 
 

Remaining nations:

 
 

 
 

Draw

 relegated to Group II in 2019.
 and  advance to World Group Play-off.

First round

China vs. New Zealand

Pakistan vs. South Korea

Second round

China vs. India

Pakistan vs. Uzbekistan

Second round play-offs

South Korea vs. New Zealand

References

External links
Official Website

Asia/Oceania Zone Group I
Davis Cup Asia/Oceania Zone